The Miracle of the Cards is 2001 American made-for-television drama film distributed by Cloud Ten Pictures. It starred Kirk Cameron, Karin Konoval, Catherine Oxenberg, Peter Wingfield and Richard Thomas. It first aired on November 10, 2001 on PAX (now known as Ion Television).

The Miracle of the Cards''' taglines were "Witness the power of faith" and "Can the whole world's prayers work a miracle?" It was not rated by the Motion Picture Association of America.

 Plot The Miracle of the Cards is based on the true story of English youngster Craig Shergold (Thomas Sangster), who in 1988 is diagnosed with a brain tumor. Although the prognosis is negative, Craig's mother Marion (Catherine Oxenberg) becomes convinced that there is a cure for it, and that the means of finding that cure is to break the Guinness World Record for receiving greeting cards. Broadcasting a plea to everyone in the world, Marion is successful in bringing 350 million cards to Craig's door. One of those cards provides the key for Craig's ultimate salvation. A cynical reporter, Josh (Kirk Cameron), finds himself witnessing a miracle he can hardly believe.

 References 

 External links 

The Miracle of the Cards at MSN
The Miracle of the Cards at The New York Times''

2001 television films
2001 films
Cloud Ten Pictures films
Films about evangelicalism
2001 drama films
Films set in the 1980s
Films set in 1988
American drama television films
Films directed by Mark Griffiths (director)
2000s American films